is a second class airport located  northeast of Niigata Station in Niigata, Japan.

History
The first airport on the Sea of Japan coast of Japan was opened on an island in the Shinano River in 1929. This airport was moved to what was then the village of Matsugazakahama in 1930, and was renamed Niigata Airport. It was requisitioned for use by the Imperial Japanese Army Air Force in 1941, and came under the control of the USAAF after the end of World War II. It was returned to Japanese civilian control on March 31, 1958, on which date commercial flight operations were resumed. International services were started in 1973, with scheduled service to Khabarovsk and Niigata Airport became historically an important gateway for traffic to and from Russia, which among other purposes were used to export Niigata-area agricultural products to Russia; however, flights were reduced from winter 2010 as more slots became available for Russia service at Narita International Airport near Tokyo.

The airport saw several major service expansions in the spring of 2012, when China Eastern Airlines, Fuji Dream Airlines and All Nippon Airways announced service to Shanghai, Nagoya and Narita respectively.

Airlines and destinations

The following destinations are served from Niigata:

Ground transportation

Scheduled "limousine bus" service is provided to and from Niigata Station every 20 minutes and heavily subsidized by Niigata Prefecture. Niigata Airport currently has no direct rail access, although regional authorities have conducted studies aimed at potentially extending the Joetsu Shinkansen high-speed rail line or other nearby ordinary rail lines to the airport.

References

External links

Official website 
Niigata Airport Building 

Airports in Japan
Transport in Niigata Prefecture
Buildings and structures in Niigata (city)
1929 establishments in Japan
Airports established in 1929